DNCE is the debut studio album by American band DNCE. It was released through Republic Records on November 18, 2016. The album features a sole guest appearance from Kent Jones. It includes three out of four songs from their debut EP, Swaay (2015). As a "dance-oriented pop" album, DNCE also contains influences of new wave, dance-rock, disco, and alternative pop. Lead singer Joe Jonas co-wrote every track on the standard edition of the album with a variety of collaborators including Ilya Salmanzadeh, Rami Yacoub, Mattman & Robin, Justin Tranter, and Sir Nolan.

Upon release, the album was met with generally positive reviews from music critics, who praised Jonas' maturity and the band's mainstream appeal. DNCE debuted in the top 20 on the Billboard 200, but performed only moderately well on the album charts in other countries, earning its highest international peak in Australia at number 32.

The album's predecessor, Swaay, produced two hit singles, including "Cake by the Ocean", which reached the top 10 on multiple record charts worldwide and was certified three-times platinum by the Recording Industry Association of America. Single "Toothbrush" and another song from the EP, "Pay My Rent", are also included on DNCE. "Body Moves" was released on September 30, 2016, as the official lead single for the album, but failed to chart on the Billboard Hot 100.

Release and promotion
In February 2016, the band told PopCrush that they were nearly done recording the album and that it was to be released that summer. However, following the success of "Cake by the Ocean" and "Toothbrush", the album's release was pushed back to allow the band to properly promote the singles. In August, Billboard reported that recording was finished. The album's title of DNCE and release date of November 18, 2016, were announced on September 14, 2016, through a promotional video.

Three tracks were released as promotional singles during the three weeks directly preceding the album's release: "Blown", which features Kent Jones, on October 28, 2016; "Good Day" on November 4, 2016; and "Be Mean" on November 11, 2016.

Singles
"Body Moves" was released as the lead single for DNCE on September 30, 2016. An accompanying video premiered October 11, 2016, that features the band members in provocative scenarios. "Body Moves" reached the top 2 on the Billboard Dance Club Songs chart.

"Good Day" received an official remix on September 22, 2017.

Critical reception

DNCE received generally favorable reviews from music critics. At Metacritic, which assigns a normalized rating out of 100 to reviews from mainstream publications, it received an average score of 77, based on 4 reviews. Matt Collar of AllMusic wrote that "it's [the band's] stylistically open-minded approach to pop that makes DNCE such a joyous and undeniably fun album." Collar also complimented frontman Jonas for being a "deeply self-aware and confident performer." Nolan Feeney of Entertainment Weekly commented on a lack of clear identity on the album, but conceded that the group "ultimately finds its groove with retro, funk-heavy tracks like new single "Body Moves" and "Blown,"" grading the album a B. Writing for Rolling Stone, Brittany Spanos called the album "a mature spin on the boy band formula that worked so well for Jonas and his brothers in the past," and wrote that "DNCE's greatest strength is never taking themselves too seriously."

Rachel Sonis of Idolator gave the album a mixed review, writing that "there's real potential" on the album, but that too many tracks feel "forced" or "like fillers." Newsday rated the song an A−, with reviewer Glenn Gamboa writing that the album represents "lighthearted dance pop done right." Si Hawkins of The National wrote that "DNCE is enormous fun, chock-full of exactly what you hope for when buying an album as a result of one big hit: more of the same," and also praised Jonas' vocals.

Commercial performance
DNCE debuted at number 17 on the Billboard 200 chart dated December 10, 2016, with approximately 25,000 album-equivalent units. On the Top Album Sales component chart, the album entered at number 14, selling approximately 19,000 units.

Track listing

Personnel
DNCE
 Joe Jonas – lead vocals (all tracks), background vocals (1, 3, 4, 6–9, 11, 13, 14)
 Jack Lawless – drums (1, 2, 6–14), background vocals (2, 4, 6–9, 11–14), percussion (10, 12)
 Cole Whittle – bass (1, 2, 4, 6–14), background vocals (2, 4, 6–9, 11–14)
 JinJoo Lee – guitar (1, 2, 4, 6–14), background vocals (2, 4, 6–9, 11–14)

Additional musicians

 James Alan Ghaleb – background vocals (1, 4, 5, 7, 11); guitar, percussion (5)
 Justin Tranter – background vocals (1, 3, 6, 7, 9, 12, 13)
 Rickard Göransson – background vocals, bass, guitar (1, 5, 12); percussion (1, 5)
 Ilya – keyboards, percussion, programming (1, 5, 12); bass (1, 12); background vocals, guitar (12)
 Albin Nedler – programming (2, 10), background vocals (2), vocal arrangement (10)
 Kristoffer Fogelmark – background vocals, drums, guitar, programming (2, 10); percussion, vocal arrangement (10)
 Jonas Thander – horn arrangement, saxophones (2)
 Rami – programming (2, 10); bass, percussion, vocal arrangement (10)
 Staffan Findin – trombone (2)
 Patrik Skogh – trumpet (2)
 Stefan Persson – trumpet (2)
 Mattman & Robin – background vocals, bass, drums, guitar, percussion, programming (3, 7, 9, 13); tambourine (7, 9), synthesizer programming (9)
 Oscar Görres – background vocals, bass, guitar (4, 6, 11); percussion, tambourine (4, 11); keyboards, programming (6)
 Oscar Holter – background vocals, programming (4, 6, 11); percussion, synthesizer programming, tambourine (4, 11); bass, guitar, keyboards (6)
 Peter Carlsson – drums (5)
 Frank Jonas – background vocals (6)
 Paul Phamous – background vocals (6)
 Jake Faun – guitar (8)
 Torin Martinez – guitar (8)
 Nolan Lambroza – programming (8, 14)
 Noah "Mailbox" Passovoy – percussion (10, 12); guitar, keyboards, programming (12)
 Max Martin – vocal arrangement (10)

Technical

 Serban Ghenea – mixing (1–7, 9–13)
 Tony Maserati – mixing (8, 14)
 John Hanes – engineering (1, 2, 4, 7, 9–12), mixing assistance (3, 13)
 Noah "Mailbox" Passovoy – engineering (1, 2, 4, 6, 7, 9–12)
 Sam Holland – engineering (1, 5, 11), engineering assistance (12)
 Ben Sedano – engineering (1, 4, 6, 11)
 Albin Nedler – engineering (2, 10)
 Kristoffer Fogelmark – engineering (2, 10)
 Rami – engineering (2, 10)
 John Cranfield – engineering (7, 9, 13)
 Nolan Lambroza – engineering (8, 14)
 Derrick Stockwell – engineering (9), engineering assistance (12)
 Thomas Cullison – engineering (10)
 Ilya – engineering (12)
 Cory Bice – engineering assistance (1, 5, 12)
 Jeremy Lertola – engineering assistance (1, 5, 12)
 David Kim – engineering assistance (10)
 Eric Eylands – engineering assistance (12)

Charts

Certifications

References

2016 debut albums
DNCE albums
Albums produced by Ilya Salmanzadeh
Albums produced by Mattman & Robin
Albums produced by Rami Yacoub
Republic Records albums